The Montreal Metro is a rubber-tired underground rapid transit system serving Greater Montreal, Quebec, Canada. The Metro, operated by the Société de transport de Montréal (STM), was inaugurated on October 14, 1966, during the tenure of Mayor Jean Drapeau.

It has expanded since its opening from 22 stations on two lines to 68 stations on four lines totalling  in length, serving the north, east and centre of the Island of Montreal with connections to Longueuil, via the Yellow Line, and Laval, via the Orange Line.

In ,  trips on the Metro were completed. According to the STM, the Metro system had transported over 7 billion passengers as of 2010. With the Metro and the REM, Montreal has built one of North America's largest urban rapid transit schemes, attracting the second-highest ridership per capita behind New York City.

History 

Urban transit began in Montreal in 1861 when a line of horse-drawn cars started to operate on Craig (now St-Antoine) and Notre-Dame streets. Eventually, as the city grew, a comprehensive network of streetcar lines provided service almost everywhere. But urban congestion started to take its toll on streetcar punctuality, so the idea of an underground system was soon considered.

Fifty years of projects 
In 1902, as European and American cities were inaugurating their first subway systems, the federal government created the Montreal Subway Company to promote the idea in Canada.

Starting in 1910, many proposals were tabled but the Montreal Metro would prove to be an elusive goal. First, the Montreal Street Railway Company, the Montreal Central Terminal Company and the Montreal Underground and Elevated Railway Company undertook fruitless negotiations with the city. Then a year later, the Comptoir Financier Franco-Canadien and the Montreal Tunnel Company proposed tunnels under the city centre and the Saint-Lawrence River to link the emerging South Shore neighbourhoods but faced the opposition of railway companies. The Montreal Tramways Company (MTC) was the first to receive the approval of the provincial government in 1913 and four years to start construction. The reluctance of elected city officials to advance funds foiled this first attempt.

The issue of a subway remained present in the newspapers but World War I and the following recession hitting Montreal prevented any execution. The gradual return of the financial health during the 1920s brought the MTC project back and attracted support from the Premier of Quebec. The Great Depression, indebting Montreal again and atrophying its streetcars attendance, overcame this new attempt and the next devised by Mayor Camillien Houde in 1939 as a way to provide work for the jobless masses.

World War II and the war effort in Montreal resurrected trams crowding. In 1944, the MTC proposed a two-line network, one line running underneath Saint Catherine Street, the other under Saint Denis and Notre-Dame and Saint Jacques Streets. In 1953 the newly formed public Montreal Transportation Commission replaced streetcars by buses and proposed a single subway line reusing the 1944 plans and extending it all the way to Boulevard Crémazie, right by the D'Youville maintenance shops. By this point, construction was already well underway on Canada's first subway line in Toronto under Yonge Street, which would be opened in 1954. Still, Montreal councillors remained cautious and no work was initiated. For some of them, including Jean Drapeau during its first municipal term, public transit was a thing of the past.

In 1959, a private company, the Société d'expansion métropolitaine, offered to build a rubber-tired metro but the Transportation Commission wanted its own network and rejected the offer. This was the last missed opportunity, for the re-election of Jean Drapeau as mayor and the arrival of his right-hand man, Lucien Saulnier, changed everything. In the early 1960s, the western world experienced an economic boom and Quebec underwent its Quiet Revolution. From August 1, 1960, many municipal services were reviewing the project and on November 3, 1961, the Montreal City Council voted appropriations amounting to $132 million ($1.06 billion in 2016) to construct and equip an initial network  in length.

Building the Metro 
The 1961 plan reused several previous studies and planned three lines carved into the rock under the city centre to the most populated areas of the city. The Montreal Metro was inspired by the Paris Métro, which is clearly seen in the Metro's station design and rolling stock.

The first two lines 

The main line, or Line 1 (Green Line) was to pass between the two most important arteries, Saint Catherine and Sherbrooke streets, more or less under the De Maisonneuve Boulevard. Line 2 (Orange Line) was to run from north of the downtown, from Crémazie station through various residential neighbourhoods to the business district at Place-d'Armes station.

Construction of the first two lines began May 23, 1962, under the supervision of the Director of Public Works, Lucien L'Allier. The project, which employed more than 5,000 workers at its height, and cost the lives of 12 of them, ended on October 14, 1966. The service was opened gradually between October 1966 and April 1967 as the stations were completed.

Cancellation of Line 3

A third line was planned. It was to use Canadian National Railway (CN) tracks passing under the Mount Royal to reach the northwest suburb of Cartierville from the city centre. Unlike the previous two lines, trains were to be partly running above ground. Negotiations with the CN and municipalities were stalling as Montreal was chosen in November 1962 to hold the 1967 Universal Exposition (Expo 67). Having to make a choice, the city decided that a number 4 line  (Yellow Line) linking Montreal to the South Shore suburbs following a plan similar to those proposed early in the 20th century was more necessary.

Line 3 was never built and the number was never used again. The railway, already used for a commuter train to the North Shore at Deux-Montagnes, was completely renovated in the early 1990s and effectively replaced the planned third line. The next line would thus be numbered 5 (Blue Line). Subsequently, elements of the line, particularly the Deux-Montagnes commuter train, became the first line of the Réseau Express Métropolitain.

Expo 67 
The Montreal municipal administration asked municipalities of the South Shore of the Saint Lawrence River which one would be interested in the Metro and Longueuil got the link. Line 4 (Yellow Line) would therefore pass under the river, from Berri-de-Montigny station, junction of Line 1 (Green Line) and Line 2 (Orange Line), to Longueuil. A stop was added in between to access the site of Expo 67, built on two islands of the Hochelaga Archipelago in the river. Saint Helen's Island, on which the station of the same name was built, was massively enlarged and consolidated with several nearby islands (including Ronde Island) using backfill excavated during the construction of the Metro. Notre Dame Island, adjacent, was created from scratch with the same material. Line 4 (Yellow Line) was completed on April 1, 1967, in time for the opening of the World's Fair.

The first Metro network was completed with the public opening of Line 4 (Yellow Line) on April 28, 1967. The cities of Montreal, Longueuil and Westmount had assumed the entire cost of construction and equipment of $213.7 million ($1.6 billion in 2016). Montreal became the seventh city in North America to operate a subway.

Extensions and unbuilt lines 

In 1970, the Montreal Urban Community (MUC) was created. This group was made of municipalities that occupy the Island of Montreal and the city of Montreal was the biggest participant. MUC's mission was to provide standardized services at a regional level, one of them being transportation. The MUC Transportation Commission was thus created at the same time to serve as prime contractor for the Metro extensions. It merged all island transport companies and became the Société de transport de la communauté urbaine de Montréal (STCUM) in 1985 and then the Société de transport de Montréal (STM) in 2002.

Montreal Olympics 
The success of the Metro increased the pressure to extend the network to other populated areas, including the suburbs on the Island of Montreal. After being awarded, in May 1970, the 1976 Summer Olympics, a loan of $430 million ($2.7 billion in 2016) was approved by the MUC on February 12, 1971, to fund the extensions of Line 1 (Green Line) and Line 2 (Orange Line) and the construction of a transverse line: Line 5 (Blue Line). The Government of Quebec agreed to bear 60% of the costs.

The work on the extensions started October 14, 1971, with Line 1 (Green Line) towards the east to reach the site where the Olympic Stadium was to be built and Autoroute 25 ( station) that could serve as a transfer point for visitors arriving from outside. The extensions were an opportunity to make improvements to the network, such as new trains, larger stations and even semi-automatic control. The first extension was completed in June 1976 just before the Olympics. This station opened in September 1978.

In the process, further extensions were planned and in 1975 spending was expected to reach reached $1.6 billion ($7.3 billion in 2016). Faced with these soaring costs, the Government of Quebec declared a moratorium May 19, 1976, to the all-out expansion desired by Mayor Jean Drapeau. Tenders were frozen, including those of Line 2 (Orange Line) after the  station and those of Line 5 (Blue Line) whose works were yet already underway. A struggle then ensued between the MUC and the Government of Quebec as any extension could not be done without the agreement of both parties. The Montreal Transportation Office may have tried to put the government in front of a fait accompli by awarding large contracts to build the tunnel between  station and the Bois-Franc station just before the moratorium was in force.

Moratorium on Metro expansion 

In 1977, the newly elected government partially lifted the moratorium on the extension of Line 2 (Orange Line) and the construction of Line 5 (Blue Line).

Line 2 (Orange Line) was gradually extended westward to  station in 1980 and to  station in 1981. As the stations were completed, the service was extended. In December 1979 Quebec presented its "integrated transport plan" in which Line 2 (Orange Line) was to be tunnelled to Du Collège station and Line 5 (Blue Line) from  station to Anjou station. The plan proposed no other underground lines as the government preferred the option of converting existing railway lines to overground Metro ones. The mayors of the MUC, initially reluctant, accepted this plan when Quebec promised in February 1981 to finance future extensions fully. The moratorium was then modestly lifted on Line 2 (Orange Line) that reached Du Collège station in 1984 and finally  station in 1986. This line took the shape of an "U" linking the north of the island to the city centre and serving two very populous axes.

The various moratoriums and technical difficulties encountered during the construction of the fourth line stretched the project over fourteen years. Line 5 (Blue Line), which runs through the centre of the island of Montreal, crossed the east branch of Line 2 (Orange Line) at the  station in 1986 and its west branch at the Snowdon) station in 1988.  Because it was not crowded, the STCUM at first operated Line 5 (Blue Line) weekdays only from 5:30 am to 7:30 pm and was circulating only three-car trains instead of the nine car trains use on the other lines. Students from the University of Montreal, the main source of customers, obtained extension of the closing time to 11:10 pm and then 0:15 am in 2002.

Recession and unfinished projects 

In the late 1980s, the original network length had nearly quadrupled in twenty years and exceeded that of Toronto, but the plans did not stop there. In its 1983–1984 scenario, the MUC planned a new underground Metro Line 7 (White Line) ( station to Montréal-Nord) and several surface lines numbered Line 6 (Du College station to Repentigny), Line 8 ( station to Pointe-aux-Trembles), Line 10 (Vendome station to Lachine) and Line 11 ( station LaSalle). In 1985, a new government in Quebec rejected the project, replacing the Metro lines by commuter train lines in its own 1988 transport plan. Yet the provincial elections of 1989 approaching, the Line 7 (White Line) project reappeared and the extensions of Line 5 (Blue Line) to Anjou (Pie-IX, Viau, Lacordaire, Langelier and Galeries d'Anjou) and Line 2 (Orange Line) northward (Deguire/Poirier, Bois-Franc and Salaberry) were announced.

At the beginning of the 1990s, there was a significant deficit in public finances across Canada, especially in Quebec, and an economic recession.  Metro ridership decreased and the Government of Quebec removed subsidies for the operation of urban public transport. Faced with this situation, the extensions projects were put on hold and the MUC prioritized the renovation of its infrastructures.

Creation of AMT, RTM, ARTM, and improvements 
In 1996, the Government of Quebec created a supra-municipal agency, the Agence métropolitaine de transport (AMT), whose mandate is to coordinate the development of transport throughout the Greater Montreal area. The AMT was responsible, among others, for the development of the Metro and suburban trains.

On June 1, 2017, the AMT was disbanded and replaced by two distinct agencies by the Loi 76 (English: Bill 76), the Autorité régionale de transport métropolitain (ARTM), mandated to manage and integrate road transport and public transportation in Greater Montreal; and the Réseau de transport métropolitain (RTM, publicly known as exo), which took over all operations from the former Agence métropolitaine de transport. RTM now operates Montreal's commuter rail and metropolitan bus services, and is the second busiest such system in Canada after Toronto's GO Transit.

Laval extension 

Announced in 1998 by the STCUM, the project to extend Line 2 (Orange) past the Henri-Bourassa terminus to the city of Laval, passing under the Rivière des Prairies, was launched March 18, 2002. The extension was decided and funded by the Government of Quebec. The AMT received the mandate of its implementation but the ownership and operation of the line stayed with the Société de transport de Montréal (STCUM successor). The work completed, opening to the public happened April 28, 2007. This extension added  to the network and three stations in Laval (De la Concorde and Montmorency). As of 2009, ridership increased by 60,000 a day with these new stations.

Major renovations 
Since 2004, most of the STM's investments have been directed to rolling stock and infrastructure renovation programs. New trains (MPM-10) have been delivered, replacing the older MR-63 trains. Tunnels are being repaired and several stations, including , have been several years in rehabilitation. Many electrical and ventilation structures on the surface are in 2016 completely rebuilt to modern standards. Station accessibility has also been improved, with over 20 of the 68 stations having elevators installed since 2007.

Future growth

Anjou extension project 
In December 2011, the AMT proposed its "Vision 2020" plan expanding the Line 5 (Blue) towards the borough of Anjou and Line 2 (Orange) towards  train station. On September 20, 2013, the Société de transport de Montréal (STM) and provincial government announced the extension of the Line 5 east as far as Anjou with five new stations. After the Parti Québécois lost the 2014 provincial election, the future of the Blue Line extension came into question. The successor Liberal government had expressed interest in extending mass transit to the Airport and implementing a light rail line on the new Champlain Bridge under construction. The project could cost up to $3 billion based on a February 2016 reassessment. Because of funding for infrastructure promised by the federal government in 2015, the Blue Line project remains a priority, according to Quebec and the STM. In April 2018, the successor Liberal government, along with the Federal government, announced firm plans for the Anjou extension. Construction on the Blue Line extension was slated to begin in 2021, with a completion date in 2026; however, ballooning costs and delays put the project on hold. In 2021, it was reported land expropriations had increased the estimated cost over $6billion and would push its completion date to 2028 or later, temporarily putting the project's future in doubt.

Pink Line 
In 2017, Valérie Plante proposed the Pink Line as part of her campaign for the office of Mayor of Montreal. The new route would have had 29 stations and would have primarily linked northeastern Montreal with the downtown areas, as well as the western end of NDG and Lachine. The project has since been added to Quebec's 10-year infrastructure plan, and feasibility studies for the line's western section began in June 2021.

Network 

The Montreal Metro consists of four lines, which are usually identified by their colour or terminus station. The terminus station in the direction of travel is used to differentiate between directions.

Lines and operation 
The Yellow Line is the shortest line, with three stations, built for Expo 67. Metro lines that leave the Île de Montréal are the Orange Line, which continues to Laval, and the Yellow Line, which continues to Longueuil.

Metro service starts at 05:30, and the last trains start their run between 00:30 and 01:00 on weekdays and Sunday, and between 01:00 and 01:30 on Saturday. During rush hour, there are two to four minutes between trains on the Orange and Green Lines. The frequency decreases to 12 minutes during late nights.

Fares

The Société de transport de Montréal (STM) operates Metro and bus services in Montreal, and transfers between the two are free inside a 120-minute time frame after the first validation.

On July 1, 2022, the ARTM reorganized its fare system into 4 zones: A, B, C, and D. The island of Montreal was placed in zone A and fares for zones B, C and D can be bought separately or together. The Metro fares are fully integrated with the Exo commuter rail system, which links the metropolitan area to the outer suburbs via six interchange stations (De la Concorde, and Parc) and the réseau express métropolitain (REM), scheduled to open in the second quarter of 2023. The fares for Exo, the REM and the Metro for zone A are only valid on the island of Montreal. In order to take the Exo, REM or Metro trains from Montreal to Laval (zone B), you must have the corresponding fares for that zone; for example, an all modes AB fare.

Fare payment is via a barrier system accepting magnetic tickets and RFID-like contactless cards. A rechargeable contactless smart card called "OPUS" was unveiled on April 21, 2008; it provides seamless integration with other transit networks of neighbouring cities by being capable of holding multiple transport tickets: tickets, books or subscriptions, a subscription for Montreal only and commuter train tickets. Moreover, unlike the magnetic stripe cards, which had been sold alongside the new OPUS cards up until May 2009, the contactless cards are not at risk of becoming demagnetized and rendered useless and do not require patrons to slide them through a reader.

Since 2015, customers have been able to purchase an OPUS card reader to recharge their personal card online from a computer. In 2016, the STM is developing a smart phone application featuring NFC technology, which could replace the OPUS card.

MétroVision

Metro stations are equipped with MétroVision information screens displaying advertising, news headlines from the RDI, and MétéoMédia weather information, as well as STM-specific information regarding service changes, service delays and other information about using the system. By the end of 2014, the STM had installed screens in all 68 stations. Berri–UQAM station was the first station to have these screens installed.

Ridership 

Montreal Metro ridership has more than doubled since it opened: the number of passengers increased from 136 million in 1967 to 357 million in 2014. Montreal has one of North America's busiest public transportation systems with, after New York, the largest number of users compared to its population. However, this growth was not continuous: in the late 1960s and early 1990s, ridership declined during some periods. From 1996 to 2015, the number of passengers grew. Today, portions of the busiest lines, such as Line 1 between Berri–UQAM and McGill stations and Line 2 between Jean-Talon and Champ-de-Mars, experience overcrowding during peak hours. It is not uncommon for travellers in these sections to let several trains pass before being able to board. Conditions at these stations worsen in summer because of the lack of air conditioning and heat generated by the trains.

In 2014, the five most popular stations (in millions of inbound travellers) were  (12.8),  (11.1),  (8.1),  (8.1) and  (7.6); all of these but Côte-Vertu are located downtown.

Funding 

The network operations funding (maintenance, equipment purchase and salaries) is provided by the STM. Tickets and subscriptions cover only 40% of the actual operational costs, with the shortfall offset by the urban agglomeration of Montreal (28%), the Montreal Metropolitan Community (5%) and the Government of Quebec (23%).

The STM does not keep separate accounts for Metro and buses services, therefore the following figures include both activities. In 2016, direct operating revenue planned by the STM totalled $667 million. To compensate for the reduced rates, the city will pay $513 million plus $351 million from Quebec. For a budget of $1.53 billion, salaries account for 57% of expenditures, followed in importance by financial expenses (22%) resulting from a 2.85 billion debt. For the Metro only, wages represented 75% of the $292 million operating costs, before electricity costs (9%).

Heavy investment (network extensions) is entirely funded by the provincial government. Renovations and service improvements are subsidized up to 100% by the Government of Canada, the province and the urban agglomeration. For example, 74% of the rolling stock replacement cost is paid for by Quebec while 33% of the bill for upgrades to ventilation structures is covered by the federal government. Small investments to maintain the network in working order remain entirely the responsibility of the STM.

Security 

Montreal Metro facilities are patrolled daily by 155 STM inspectors and 115 agents of the Montreal Police Service (SPVM) assigned to the subway. They are in contact with the command centre of the Metro which has 2,000 cameras distributed on the network, coupled with a computerized visual recognition system.

On station platforms, emergency points are available with a telephone connected to the command centre, an emergency power supply cut-off switch and a fire extinguisher. The power supply system is segmented into short sections that can be independently powered, so that following an incident a single train can be stopped while the others reach the nearest station.

In tunnels, a raised path at trains level facilitates evacuation and allows people movement without walking on the tracks. Every 15 meters, directions are indicated by illuminated yellow signs. Every 150 meters, emergency stations with telephones, power switches and fire hoses can be found. At the ventilation shafts locations in the old tunnels or every 750 meters in recent tunnels sections (Laval), emergency exits reach the surface.

On the surface, blue fire hydrants in the streets are dry risers connected to the Metro fire control system. If a fire breaks out in tunnels, firefighters connect the red fire hydrant with the blue terminals to power the subway system. This decoupling prevents accidental flooding.

Station design 

The design of the Metro was heavily influenced by Montreal's winter conditions. Unlike other cities' subways, nearly all station entrances in Montreal are set back from the sidewalk and completely enclosed; usually in small, separate buildings or within building facades. They are equipped with swivelling "butterfly" doors meant to mitigate the wind caused by train movements that can make doors difficult to open. The entire system runs underground and some stations are directly connected to buildings, making the Metro an integral part of Montreal's Underground City.

The network has 68 stations, four of which have connections between Metro lines, and five connect to the commuter train network. They are mostly named after streets adjacent to them.

The deepest station of the network, has its  bound platform located  underground.

The terminus stations of future extensions could be equipped with central platforms to accommodate a turning loop.

Architectural design and public art 

The Montreal Metro is renowned for its architecture and public art. Under the direction of Drapeau, a competition among Canadian architects was held to decide the design of each station, ensuring that every station was built in a different style by a different architect. However, numerous interventions, such as the installation of public telephones and loudspeakers, with visible wiring, have had a significant impact on the elegance of many stations.

Along with the Stockholm metro, Montreal pioneered the installation of public art in the Metro among capitalist countries, a practice that beforehand was mostly found in socialist and communist nations (the Moscow Metro being a case in point). More than fifty stations are decorated with over one hundred works of public art, such as sculpture, stained glass, and murals by noted Quebec artists, including members of the famous art movement, the Automatistes.

Some of the most important works in the Metro include the stained-glass window at  station, the masterpiece of major Quebec artist Marcelle Ferron; and the Guimard entrance at Square-Victoria-OACI station, largely consisting of parts from the famous entrances designed for the Paris Métro, on permanent loan since 1966 by the RATP to commemorate its cooperation in constructing the Metro. Installed in 1967 (the 100th anniversary of Hector Guimard's birth), this is the only authentic Guimard entrance in use outside Paris.

Accessibility

The Montreal Metro was a late adopter of accessibility compared to many metro systems (including those older than the Metro), much to the dismay and criticism of accessibility advocates in Montreal. Four existing stations, and were made accessible between 2009 and 2010.

, there are 25 accessible stations on the system, most of which are on the Orange Line. All interchange stations between subway lines are accessible, but  is currently only accessible for the Orange and Green lines. From May 2022, work is underway at Berri–UQAM to make the station fully accessible.

In 2015, the new McGill University Health Centre mega-hospital opened adjacent to  station, with a new underground pedestrian tunnel to link the hospital to the station. However, the STM was criticized as many visitors to the hospital have reduced mobility and the station was not accessible. Work began in 2017 to make the station accessible; it was completed in 2021.

The Montreal Metro aims to have over 30 accessible stations by 2025 and expects all subway stations to be accessible by 2038. In comparison, the Toronto subway (first opened in 1954) will be fully accessible by 2025, and all Vancouver SkyTrain stations have been accessible from that system's opening in 1985, save for Granville station, which became accessible in 2006.

Rolling stock
The Montreal Metro's car fleet uses rubber tires instead of steel wheels. As the Metro runs entirely underground, the cars and the electrical system are not weatherproof. This narrow width allowed the use of single tunnels (for both tracks) in construction of the Metro lines.

The first generation of rolling stock in Montreal went beyond just adopting the MP 59 car from the Paris Métro. North American cities building metro systems in the 1960s and 1970s (Washington, D.C., San Francisco and Atlanta) were in search of modern rolling stock that not only best fit their needs but also encompassed a change in industrial design that focused on the aesthetics and performances. Until June 2018, some of the Montreal trains were among the oldest North American subway trains in service – the Canadian Vickers MR-63 dating back to the system's opening in 1966 – but extended longevity is expected of rolling stock operated under fully sheltered conditions.

Unlike the subway cars of most metro systems in North America, but like those in most of Europe, Montreal's cars do not have air conditioning. In summer, the lack of cooled air can make trips uncomfortable for passengers. The claim, stated by the STM, is that with the Metro being built entirely underground, air conditioning would heat the tunnels to temperatures that would be too hot to operate the trains.

Models

Current

 Bombardier Transportation MR-73, introduced in 1976. Once used in majority on the Orange Line, they were migrated to the Green Line as MR-63 were being retired. They are now the sole rolling stock on the Blue and Yellow Lines, and run alongside the MPM-10 on the Green Line during weekdays.
 Bombardier MPM-10, named "Azur" by the public in 2012, entered service in 2016. The order completely replaced the outgoing MR-63 model. They use an open gangway design that allows passengers to walk from one end of the train to the other. They are currently the sole rolling stock running on the Orange line, and run in mixed service with the MR-73 on the Green Line during weekdays. On weekends, only Azur trains are used on the Green Line.

Retired
 Canadian Vickers MR-63, were in service from the metro's opening in October 1966 until June 2018. Of the original 369 cars built, 33 were destroyed in two separate accidents. On June 21, 2018, the last of the MR-63 trains was completely retired after 52 years of service.

Design

Montreal's Metro trains are made of low-alloy high-tensile steel, painted blue with a thick white stripe running lengthwise. Trains are assembled in three-, six- or nine-car lengths. Each three-car segment element consists of two motor cab cars encompassing a trailer car (M-T-M). Design specifications called for station dwell times of typically 8 to 15 seconds. In response to overcrowding on the Orange Line, a redesign of the MR-73 cars removed some seats to provide more standing room. The newest Bombardier MPM-10 trains are open-gangway, allowing passengers to move between cars once on board such that the passenger load is more evenly distributed.

Each car has two sets of bogies (trucks), each with four sets of support tires, guide tires and backup conventional steel wheels. The motor cars' bogies each have two direct-current traction motors coupled to reduction gears and differentials. The train then uses composite brake blocks made of yellow birch injected with peanut oil to bring it to a complete stop. Two sets are applied against the treads of the steel wheels for friction braking. Hard braking produces a characteristic burnt popcorn scent. Wooden brake shoes perform well, but if subjected to numerous high-speed applications they develop a carbon film that diminishes brake performance. The rationale for using wooden brake shoes soaked in peanut oil was health concernsthe use of wooden brake shoes avoids releasing metal dust into the air upon braking. It also reduces screeching noise when braking and prolongs the life of steel wheels.

Rubber tires on the Montreal Metro transmit minimal vibration and help the cars go uphill more easily and negotiate turns at high speeds. However, the advantages of rubber tires are offset by noise levels generated by traction motors which are noisier than the typical North American subway car. Trains can climb grades of up to 6.5% and economize the most energy when following a humped-station profile (track profiles that descend to accelerate after leaving a station and climb before entering the station). Steel-wheel train technology has undergone significant advances and can better round tight curves, and climb and descend similar grades and slopes but despite these advances, steel-wheel trains still cannot operate at high speeds on the same steep or tightly curved track profiles as a train equipped with rubber tires.

The release of the MR-73 generation of Metro cars introduced three audible tones heard when departing, generated by chopper circuitry. The chopper circuitry incrementally increases the traction power fed to the trains' traction motors when accelerating from a stop, allowing trains to start smoothly and avoid overloads. The final tone is present throughout the train ride on MR-73s but is not heard at higher speeds because of ambient noise. Equipment on the newest generation of Metro cars does not produce the audible tones when accelerating, though a recording of similar tones is played as an auditory signal in advance of door closure, referred to as the "dou-dou-dou" door closing signal in a 2010 STM advertising campaign. The three tones are essentially the same as the iconic first three trumpet notes from Aaron Copland's musical piece "Fanfare for the Common Man".

Train operation

The MR-73 and the former MR-63 trains are equipped with a manual train control system. However, the new MPM-10 is equipped with automatic train control. On MR-73 trains, the train operator closes the doors and pushes the speed control handle. On MPM-10 trains, the operator can operate the doors manually or they can be operated automatically, and then pushes the  button, and then the train drives itself. The train operator can also drive the MPM-10 train manually at their discretion. Signalling is effected through coded pulses sent through the rails. Coded speed orders and station stop positions transmitted through track beacons are captured by beacon readers mounted under the driver cabs. The information sent to the train's electronic modules conveys speed information, and it is up to the train automatic control system computer to conform to the imposed speed. Additionally, the train computer can receive energy-saving instructions from track beacons, providing the train with four different economical coasting modes, plus one mode for maximum performance. In case of manual control, track speed is displayed on the cab speedometer indicating the maximum permissible speed. The wayside signals consist of point (switch/turnout) position indicators in proximity to switches and inter-station signalling placed at each station stop.

Trains are programmed to stop at certain station positions with a precise odometer (accurate to plus or minus five centimetres, 2"). They receive their braking program and station stop positions orders (one-third, two-thirds, or end of station) from track beacons prior to entering the station, with additional beacons in the station for ensuring stop precision. The last beacon is positioned at precisely 12 turns of wheels from the end of the platform, which help improve the overall precision of the system.

Trains draw current from two sets of 750-volt direct current guide bar/third rails on either side of each motor car. Nine-car trains draw large currents of up to 6,000 amperes, requiring that all models of rolling stock have calibrated traction motor control systems to prevent power surges, arcing and breaker tripping. Both models have electrical braking (using motors) to assist primary friction braking, reducing the need to replace the brake pads.

The trains are equipped with double coverage broadband radio systems, provided by Thales Group.

Rolling stock maintenance

Garages 
Idle trains are stored in four garages: Angrignon, Beaugrand, Saint-Charles and Montmorency. A fifth is under construction. Except Angrignon, they are all underground and can accommodate around 46% of the rolling stock. Remaining trains are parked in terminus tail tracks.
 Angrignon garage, west of  Line 1 terminus, is a surface building next to Angrignon Park housing six tracks accepting two nine-car trains each.
 Beaugrand garage is located east of Line 1 terminus . It is entirely under the Chénier-Beaugrand Park, and its main access point is through the Honoré-Beaugrand station. It has seven tracks and accommodates light maintenance on MR-63 cars with two test tracks.
 Saint-Charles garage, north of  terminus, is located under Gouin Park. With eight tracks, allowing 20 trains to be parked, it is the main garage of Line 2. Also, under Jeanne-Sauvé Park, a training facility used by the firefighters contains one of the burnt MR-63 cars from 1973 and an obsolete picking train.
 Montmorency garage is built perpendicular to its terminal station to allow an easier potential expansion of the Line 2 deeper in Laval territory.
 Cote-Vertu garage is under construction underground at the end of Thimens boulevard to accommodate additional MPM-10 trains on Line 2. Accessible via a  tunnel, it will house a small maintenance facility and two long tracks for a total of twelve parking places. Two more tracks could be added later with the line extension.

Maintenance and repair facilities 

Rolling stock maintenance is effected in four facilities in three locations. Two small tracks are located at Montmorency and Beaugrand garages, and two large are at the Plateau d'Youville facility. A fifth facility is under construction at the Cote-Vertu garage.

The only repair facility for the Montreal Metro is Plateau d'Youville, located at the intersection of Crémazie (part of Trans-Canada Highway) and Saint-Laurent Boulevards. Built alongside the first segment and launched in October 1966, it is a large above-ground facility that provides repair of Metro cars and is the main base for the track assembly workshops (where track sections are pre-assembled prior to installation). The two-way service tunnel connecting the network to the Youville portal gate is found between Crémazie and Sauvé stations.

Tail tracks and connecting tracks 

 Centre d'attachement Duvernay is a garage and base for maintenance of way equipment. The access building is located at the corner of Duvernay and Vinet streets in Sainte-Cunégonde.
 Centre d'attachement Viau is a garage and base for maintenance of way equipment. It accesses the network immediately west of the  station (Line 1). The access building is within the Viau station building; facilities are visible from trains going west of the station.
 Berri–UQAM link is connecting Lines 1 and 4 south of Berri–UQAM station.
 Snowdon link and tail is an interchange track between Lines 2 and 5 south/west of  station used for the storage of maintenance of way equipment. There are no surface facilities. The end of the track is marked by an emergency exit on the corner of Queen Mary and Dufferin Roads.
 Cote-Vertu tail track extends  after the terminus station towards the intersection of Grenet and Deguire streets.

Future projects

City of Montreal

On June 12, 2008, the City of Montreal released its overall transportation plan for the immediate future. On April 9, 2018, construction on the Blue Line's five new stations was announced and began in 2021. The following projects were given priority status in the overall transportation scheme:
 The Blue Line extension from  station up to the boroughs of Saint-Leonard and Anjou, committing to the line's original design. It would consist of five new stations: Pie-IX, Viau, Lacordaire, Langelier and Anjou.
 The Orange Line extension northwest from the Côte-Vertu station, up to the Bois-Franc commuter rail station in Saint-Laurent. The extension would include two new stations: Poirier and Bois-Franc (an intermodal station with the Bois-Franc station of the Deux-Montagnes commuter rail line).
In the long term, a new extension of the Yellow Line from Berri–UQAM is being studied that would go to  station to ease congestion on that part of the Green Line.

In 2006 and 2007, Montreal's West Island newspapers discussed plans to extend the Blue Line from  into the Notre-Dame-de-Grâce area of Montreal, as depicted in its original design.

City of Longueuil
In 2001, the Réseau de transport de Longueuil (RTL) has considered an extension of the Yellow Line with four new stations (Vieux-Longueuil, Gentilly, Curé-Poirier/Roland-Therrien and Jacques-Cartier/De Mortagne) beyond , under the city of Longueuil to Collège Édouard-Montpetit but their priority was switched to the construction of the proposed light rail project in the Champlain bridge corridor. In 2008, Longueuil Mayor Claude Gladu brought the proposal back to life.

A 2006 study rejected the possibility and cost of an extension from  station to the City of Brossard on the south shore of Montreal as an alternative to the proposed light rail project in the Champlain bridge corridor.

In 2012, the AMT study Vision 2020, proposed extending the Yellow Line under Longueuil with six new stations.

City of Laval
He proposed that Transports Quebec, the provincial transport department, set aside $100 million annually to fund the project, which is expected to cost upwards of $1.5 billion.

On May 26, 2011, Vaillancourt, after the successful opening of highway 25 toll bridge in the eastern part of Laval, proposed that Laval develop its remaining territories with a transit-oriented development (TOD) build around five new Metro stations: four on the west branch (Gouin, Lévesque, Notre-Dame and Carrefour) of the Orange Line and one more on the east branch (De l'Agora). The next to last station on the west branch would act as a corresponding station between the east and the west branches of the line.

Pioneer in tunnel advertising
In the early years of the Montreal Metro's life, a unique mode of advertising was used. In some downtown tunnels, cartoons depicting an advertiser's product were mounted on the walls of the tunnel at the level of the cars' windows. A retail film processing outfit called Direct Film advertised on the north wall in the Westbound track of the Guy (now Guy–Concordia)-to-Atwater Station (Green Line) during 1967–1969. Strobe lights, aimed at the frames of the cartoon and triggered by the passing train, sequentially illuminated the images so that they appeared to the viewer (passenger) on the train as a movie. Today known as "tunnel movies" or "tunnel advertising", they have been installed in many cities' subways around the world in recent years, for example in the Southgate tube station in London and the MBTA Red Line in Boston.

See also

Notes and references

Notes

References

Further reading 
The Montreal Métro, a source of pride (PDF document)
P.Laprise, ed. (1983). The Montreal Metro. Montreal: Metropolitan Transit Bureau. 
Bombardier Transportation. (1974). MR-73: Fiche technique.
Programme triennial d'immobilisations 2006-2007-2008 (PDF document)
Voitures de métro MR-73 rénovées (PDF document)
Rénovation des voitures de métro MR-73 (PDF document)
Le « dou-dou-dou » du métro – Le hacheur de courant (PDF document)

Bibliography

External links

 History of Metro station names in Montréal 
 Agence métropolitaine de transport — Information on extension to Laval 

 
1966 establishments in Quebec
Modernist architecture in Canada
750 V DC railway electrification
Rubber-tyred metros